Vincent William John FitzGerald  (born 13 July 1944) is a former senior Australian public servant, now a private consultant.

Early life
Vince FitzGerald was schooled at St Augustine's College, Cairns. FitzGerald graduated from the University of Queensland in 1969 with a Bachelor of Economics with first class honours in Econometrics, and a University Medal.

Career
FitzGerald joined the Australian Public Service in 1969 as a research officer with the Australian Bureau of Statistics.

In 1985, FitzGerald was appointed a Deputy Secretary in the Department of Trade. He was promoted to Secretary of the Department in March 1986.

In July 1987, FitzGerald was shifted to the newly created Department of Employment, Education and Training. FitzGerald left the role in 1989 to join the firm Allen Consulting, a higher-paid job in the private sector.

As a consultant, FitzGerald was the architect of the compulsory superannuation scheme introduced by the Keating Government in 1992. Superannuation was later refined in response to FitzGerald's June 1993 publication National Savings: A Report to the Treasurer in which he identified the importance of national saving, and recommended ways in which national saving could be increased.

In 1995, Paul Keating called FitzGerald a "sour ex-bureaucrat" and claimed that FitzGerald had wanted to be Secretary of the Treasury but was upset to have never made it. This was a response to a criticism FitzGerald made to aspects of a Keating Budget.

Awards
In June 2016, FitzGerald was made an Officer of the Order of Australia for distinguished services to business through executive and advisory roles in economic policy development, public administration and financial management organisations, and to the community.

References

1944 births
Living people
Secretaries of the Australian Government Education Department
Harvard University alumni
Officers of the Order of Australia
University of Queensland alumni